is a Japanese professional footballer who plays as a centre back for  club Yokohama F. Marinos.

Career
Kamijima started his professional career as a specially designated player for Kashiwa Reysol, from Chuo University in the 2018 J1 League season. He joined the team fully from the 2019 season.

At the end of his first full season at Kashiwa where he made 14 appearances across all competitions, Kamijima joined Avispa Fukuoka on loan for the 2020 season. He went on to make 41 appearances and he scored his first professional goal in a 1–0 league victory over Tokushima Vortis.

Kamijima returned to Kashiwa where he played for two more seasons in the J1 League, making a further 57 appearances for the club.

On 14 December 2022, it was announced Kamijima would be moving to J1 League champions Yokohama F. Marinos for the 2023 season.

Career statistics

Club
.

References

External links

1997 births
Living people
Japanese footballers
Association football defenders
Chuo University alumni
J1 League players
J2 League players
Kashiwa Reysol players
Avispa Fukuoka players
Yokohama F. Marinos players